Martin Price (1939–1995) was a British numismatist.

Martin Price may also refer to:

Martin Price (critic), scholar of Augustan literature and Sterling Professor of English at Yale University
Martin Price, musician in 808 State
Martin Price, a character in The Muppets Take Manhattan
Martin Price, a character in the 2011 film Abduction